Susan Rollinson (born 22 August 1961) is a South African former professional tennis player.

Rollinson, born in Johannesburg, competed on the professional tour in the early 1980s. She had two noteworthy upset wins in 1981, over Wendy Turnbull in Hilton Head and Billie Jean King in Haines City.

At grand slam level, Rollinson made her only second round at the 1981 US Open, but had held a match point that year against a young Kathy Rinaldi in the Wimbledon first round.

References

External links
 
 

1961 births
Living people
South African female tennis players
Tennis players from Johannesburg